This is a list of notable theatres in the German state of Baden-Württemberg, organized by administrative district.

Freiburg 

 BAAL novo – Offenburg
 Burgfestspiele Rötteln – Lörrach
 Harrys Depot – Freiburg im Breisgau
 Stadttheater Konstanz – Konstanz
 Theater Freiburg – Freiburg im Breisgau
 Theater im Marienbad – Freiburg im Breisgau
 Wallgraben-Theater – Freiburg im Breisgau

Karlsruhe  

 Badische Landesbühne – Bruchsal
 Badisches Staatstheater Karlsruhe – Karlsruhe
 Freilichtbühne Ötigheim – Ötigheim
 Klapsmühl' am Rathaus – Mannheim
 Mannheim National Theatre – Mannheim
 Naturtheater Grötzingen – Grötzingen
 Sandkorn-Theater – Karlsruhe
 Schlosstheater Schwetzingen – Karlsruhe
 Stadttheater Pforzheim – Pforzheim
 Theater Baden-Baden – Baden-Baden
 Theater & Orchester Heidelberg – Heidelberg
 Theater der Stadt Aalen – Aalen
 TiG7 – Mannheim

Stuttgart 

 Altes Theater – Heilbronn
 Freilichtspiele Neuenstadt – Neuenstadt am Kocher
 Freilichtspiele Schwäbisch Hall – Schwäbisch Hall
 Schlosstheater Ludwigsburg – Ludwigsburg
 Theater Heilbronn – Heilbronn
 Württembergische Landesbühne Esslingen – Esslingen am Neckar

City of Stuttgart 

 Friedrichsbau
 Renitenztheater
 Schauspielbühnen Stuttgart
 Staatstheater Stuttgart
 Theater am Olgaeck
 Theaterhaus Stuttgart
 Theater tri-bühne
 Volkstheater
 Wilhelma-Theater

Tübingen 

 Landestheater Tübingen – Tübingen
 Naturtheater Hayingen – Hayingen
 Theater Lindenhof – Melchingen
 Theater Ulm – Ulm
 Waldbühne Sigmaringendorf – Sigmaringendorf
 Zimmertheater Tubingen – Tübingen

 
Baden-Württemberg
Theatre